Bellampally, also spelled Bellampalli, (Code: BPA) is a railway station in Bellampalle, Telangana and falls under the Secunderabad railway division of the South Central Railway Zone of the Indian Railways. The station is categorized as a Non Suburban Grade- 5 (NSG- 5) station.

References

Railway stations in Mancherial district